Yerravaripalem or Erravaripalem is a village in Tirupati district of the Indian state of Andhra Pradesh. It is the mandal headquarters of Yerravaripalem mandal.

Geography 

It has an average elevation of 592 meters (1945 feet).

References 

Mandal headquarters in Tirupati district
Villages in Tirupati district